Giacomo Brodolini (1920–1969) was an Italian socialist politician and trade unionist. He served as the minister of labor and social security between December 1968 and 1969.

Early life and education
Brodolini was born in Recanati on 19 July 1920. After graduating from high school he joined the army in 1940 and served there during World War II. Then he graduated from the University of Bologna receiving a degree in literature.

Career
In 1946 Brodolini joined in the Action Party, but he left it to join the Italian Socialist Party (PSI) in 1948. He was the deputy secretary of the Italian General Confederation of Labour from 1955 to 1960. He was also served as the deputy secretary of the PSI from 1963 to 1966. He held the same position in the unified Italian Democratic Socialist Party-PSI party until 1968. He was elected to the Italian Parliament in 1953 and became a senator in 1968. He was appointed minister of labor and social security in December 1968. 

He died of cancer at a hospital in Zurich on 11 July 1969.

References

External links

1920 births
1969 deaths
Action Party (Italy) politicians
Government ministers of Italy
Italian Socialist Party politicians
People from Recanati
Deaths from cancer in Switzerland
University of Bologna alumni
Italian military personnel of World War II
Deputies of Legislature II of Italy
Deputies of Legislature III of Italy
Deputies of Legislature IV of Italy
Senators of Legislature VI of Italy